Lepanto was a Spanish protected cruiser of the  that served in the Spanish navy from 1899 until her retirement in 1908.

Construction 
She was laid down on 1 October 1886 and launched on 16 November 1893 at the Arsenal de la Cartagena shipyard in Cartagena, Spain. She was completed on 26 January 1899 and named Lepanto. The ship was assessed at 4,826 tons. She had 2 triple expansion engines driving two screw propellers. The engine was rated at 11.500 nhp.

Fate 
Lepanto sailed for the Spanish Navy from 1899 until her retirement in 1908 without any incident.

References

1893 ships
Reina Regente-class cruisers
Lepanto